Błażek  is a village in the administrative district of Gmina Batorz, within Janów Lubelski County, Lublin Voivodeship, in eastern Poland.

References

Villages in Janów Lubelski County